South Korea competed (as Korea) at the 2008 Summer Olympics in Beijing, China. This is a list of all of the South Korean athletes who qualified for the Olympics and their results.  South Korea sent a delegation of 267 athletes to these games.

North and South Korea had initially intended to send a joint delegation to the Games, but were unable to agree on the details of its implementation.  (See North Korea at the 2008 Summer Olympics.)

The South Korean contingent aimed for ten gold medals and to be ranked in the top ten in the games.  However, they exceeded expectations and the nation was ranked 7th in gold medals, and 8th in total medals.  The 13 gold medals won was the highest number of gold medals earned in its Olympic history.

Medalists

Archery

At the 2007 World Outdoor Target Championships, Korea's won the championship in both the men's and women's events. This qualified the nation to send full teams of three men and three women to the Olympics.

Men

Women

Athletics 

Men
Track & road events

Field events

Women
Track & road events

Field events

Badminton 

Men

Women

Mixed

Baseball

Korea placed second in the Final Qualifying Tournament, earning the South Korea national baseball team a qualification spot in baseball. 2008 will be Korea's third appearance in the Olympic baseball tournament; the team took the bronze medal in 2000 and placed eighth in 1996. On Korea's third appearance, they won the gold.

Group Stage
 August 13  8 – 7 
 August 14  0 – 0  (Postponed due to rain)
 August 15  1 – 0 
 August 16  5 – 3 
 August 17  1 – 0 
 August 18  9 – 8 
 August 19  7 – 4 
 August 20  10 – 0 

Semifinals
 August 22  6 – 2 

Gold medal match
 August 23   3 – 2

Basketball

Women's tournament

Korea's women's basketball team qualified for the Olympics by winning the FIBA Asia Championship for Women 2007. It will be the women's team's sixth Olympic appearance.

Roster

Group play

Quarterfinals

Boxing

Korea qualified five boxers for the Olympic boxing tournament. Lee, Baik, and Kim each earned their spots at the first Asian qualifying tournament. Han and Cho joined them as Olympic qualifiers at the second qualifying tournament.

Canoeing

Sprint

Qualification Legend: Q = Qualify directly to final; q = Qualify to semi-final

Cycling

Road

Track
Omnium

Diving 

Men

Equestrian

Dressage

Fencing 

Men

Women

Field hockey

Men's tournament

Roster

Group play

Classification match for 5th/6th place

Women's tournament

Roster

Group play

Classification match for 9th/10th place

Football (soccer)

Men's tournament

Roster

Group play

Gymnastics

Artistic
Men
Team

* Kim Soo-Myun withdrew from the individual all-around due to injury in the team event, and was replaced by Yang Tae-Young.

Individual finals

Women

Rhythmic
South Korea qualified one woman in rhythmic gymnastics.

Handball

Men's tournament

Roster

Group play

Quarterfinal

Classification semifinal

7th–8th place

Women's tournament

Roster

Group play

Quarterfinal

Semifinal

Bronze medal game

Final rank

Judo 

Men

Women

Modern pentathlon

* Did not finish

Rowing 

Men

Women

Qualification Legend: FA=Final A (medal); FB=Final B (non-medal); FC=Final C (non-medal); FD=Final D (non-medal); FE=Final E (non-medal); FF=Final F (non-medal); SA/B=Semifinals A/B; SC/D=Semifinals C/D; SE/F=Semifinals E/F; QF=Quarterfinals; R=Repechage

Sailing 

Men

M = Medal race; EL = Eliminated – did not advance into the medal race; CAN = Race cancelled

Shooting 

Men

Women

Swimming

Men

Women

Table tennis 

South Korea had qualified places in both singles and team events.

Men's singles

Women's singles

Team

Taekwondo

Tennis

Weightlifting 

Men

Women

Wrestling 

Men's freestyle

Men's Greco-Roman

Women's freestyle

References

Korea, South
2008
Summer Olympics